Byhalia is an unincorporated community in Washington Township, Union County, Ohio, United States.

The Byhalia Post office was established on February 16, 1852.  As of 1877, the community contained one store, one physician, and one sawmill.  The post office was discontinued on February 14, 1906.  The mail service is now sent through the Richwood branch.

References 

Unincorporated communities in Union County, Ohio
Unincorporated communities in Ohio